Abronia vasconcelosii, sometimes known as Bocourt's arboreal alligator lizard, is a species of lizard in the family Anguidae. It is endemic to Guatemala Plateau.

References

vasconcelosii
Reptiles of Guatemala
Endemic fauna of Guatemala
Sierra Madre de Chiapas
Reptiles described in 1872
Taxa named by Marie Firmin Bocourt